The Phallus is a rock formation (pillar) in Grand County, Utah, in the United States. It is within the Arches National Park.

A climbing route has been published in guidebooks.

See also
 Yang Yuan Stone
 Phallic Rock

References

Arches National Park
Landforms of Grand County, Utah
Rock formations of Utah